Metoioceras is an extinct genus of cephalopod belonging to the Ammonite subclass which lived during the Cenomanian.

References
Notes

Ammonitida genera
Acanthoceratidae
Cretaceous ammonites
Ammonites of North America
Ammonites of Europe
Cenomanian life